Con de Wet de Lange (11 February 1981 – 18 April 2019) was a cricketer who represented Scotland. He was a left-arm orthodox spin all-rounder and a right-handed batsman. Born in South Africa, De Lange made his first-class debut for Boland in March 1998 against the touring Sri Lankans. He played for Northamptonshire County Cricket Club in the 2012 and 2013 seasons.

In October 2018, Cricket Scotland announced that de Lange was suffering from a brain tumour. In April 2019, the Professional Cricketers' Association confirmed that de Lange had died.

International career 
De Lange played for Scotland in the 2015–17 ICC Intercontinental Cup against Afghanistan in June 2015. He made his Twenty20 International (T20I) debut for Scotland against Ireland on 19 June 2015, although no play was possible due to rain. He made his One Day International (ODI) debut for Scotland against Afghanistan on 4 July 2016.

De Lange's international career lasted thirteen ODIs and eight T20Is,. He was the team's vice-captain for the Desert T20 Challenge tournament, which was played in the United Arab Emirates in January 2017. His most famous moment for Scotland came against Zimbabwe in June 2017, when his match haul of five wickets for 60 helped his team cause a famous upset, with their first win against a full member of the ICC.

Illness and death
Shortly after the victory over Zimbabwe, de Lange started missing games in the World Cricket League (WCL) championships in Dubai. Initially, the reason given for his absence was said to be "severe migraine headaches". Upon his return to Scotland for further tests, a far more severe issue was diagnosed. De Lange played his last international match for Scotland, an ODI against Papua New Guinea, on 25 November 2017.

The results of medical tests were not published initially, and it was only during the 2019 World Cup qualifiers in Zimbabwe, played in October 2018, that Cricket Scotland sent a press release stating that the then 37-year old de Lange had been battling a brain tumour for the past 10 months. After the diagnosis, de Lange underwent a series of treatments, which included an operation followed by chemotherapy and radiation treatment.

Together with his wife Claire and children, de Lange set up a fundraising appeal called 'Brain Tumour Charity', in memory of a close friend who died from the disease. As part of the initiative, the de Langes arranged walks to raise donations.

On 18 April 2019, de Lange died at the age of 38.

References

External links
 

1981 births
2019 deaths
Boland cricketers
Cape Cobras cricketers
Cricketers from Bellville, South Africa
Deaths from brain cancer in Scotland
Free State cricketers
Knights cricketers
Northamptonshire cricketers
Scotland cricketers
Scotland One Day International cricketers
Scotland Twenty20 International cricketers
Scottish cricket coaches
Scottish cricketers
South African cricket coaches
South African cricketers
White South African people
Ferguslie CC players